Perry Green is a scattered hamlet in Hertfordshire, England, near Much Hadham.

The sculptor Henry Moore settled there in 1941. His house Hoglands now forms part of a sculpture garden featuring his work, run by the Henry Moore Foundation.

Notes

Hamlets in Hertfordshire
Much Hadham